Shelia may refer to:

Shelia Burrell (born 1972), retired American heptathlete
Shelia Conover (born 1963), American sprint canoeist
Shelia Eddy (born 1995), American convicted of murder
Shelia Goss (born 1968), American author, freelance writer, and screenwriter
Shelia Jordan, the Mayor of Galway from 1977 to 1978
Shelia P. Moses, African-American writer whose subjects include comedian Dick Gregory and Buddy Bush

See also
Murtaz Shelia (born 1969), former football defender who was capped 29 times for Georgia
Sheila, a feminine given name